This is a list of the horse breeds considered in Belgium to be wholly or partly of Belgian origin, with some of the names used for them in that country:

References

Horse